Interstate 88 may refer to either of two United States Interstate highways:

 Interstate 88 (Illinois), running from East Moline to Hillside
 Interstate 88 (New York), running from Chenango to Rotterdam

88